The 1954 San Jose State Spartans football team represented San Jose State College during the 1954 college football season.

San Jose State played as an Independent in 1954. The team was led by fifth-year head coach Bob Bronzan, and played home games at Spartan Stadium in San Jose, California. They finished the season with a record of seven wins and three losses (7–3). Overall, the team outscored its opponents 191–151 for the season.

Schedule

Team players in the NFL
The following San Jose State players were selected in the 1955 NFL Draft.

The following finished their San Jose State career in 1954, were not drafted, but played in the AFL.

Notes

References

San Jose State
San Jose State Spartans football seasons
San Jose State Spartans football